The ASME Medal, created in 1920, is the highest award bestowed by the ASME (founded as the American Society of Mechanical Engineers) Board of Governors for "eminently distinguished engineering achievement". The award has been presented every year since 1996 (first medalist was awarded in 1921), and it consists of a $15,000 honorarium, a certificate, a travel supplement not to exceed $750, and a gold medal inscribed with the words, "What is not yet, may be". 

ASME also gives out a number of other awards yearly, including the Edwin F. Church Medal, the Holley medal, and the Soichiro Honda medal.

List of recipients
Source: ASME

See also

 List of engineering awards
 ASME Leonardo Da Vinci Award

References

Awards established in 1920
ASME Medals